Cyneberht is an Anglo-Saxon name

 Cyneberht early 8th century Bishop of Lindsey
 Cyneberht of Winchester 8th century Bishop of Winchester